The superconducting tunnel junction (STJ) — also known as a superconductor–insulator–superconductor tunnel junction (SIS) — is an electronic device consisting of two superconductors separated by a very thin layer of insulating material. Current passes through the junction via the process of quantum tunneling. The STJ is a type of Josephson junction, though not all the properties of the STJ are described by the Josephson effect.

These devices have a wide range of applications, including high-sensitivity detectors of electromagnetic radiation, magnetometers, high speed digital circuit elements, and quantum computing circuits.

Quantum tunneling

 
All currents flowing through the STJ pass through the insulating layer via the process of quantum tunneling.  There are two components to the tunneling current. The first is from the tunneling of Cooper pairs. This supercurrent is described by the ac and dc Josephson relations, first predicted by Brian David Josephson in 1962. For this prediction, Josephson received the Nobel prize in physics in 1973. The second is the quasiparticle current, which, in the limit of zero temperature, arises when the energy from the bias voltage  exceeds twice the value of superconducting energy gap Δ. At finite temperature, a small quasiparticle tunneling current — called the subgap current — is present even for voltages less than twice the energy gap due to the thermal promotion of quasiparticles above the gap.

If the STJ is irradiated with photons of frequency , the dc current-voltage curve will exhibit both Shapiro steps and steps due to photon-assisted tunneling. Photon-assisted tunneling arises from the response of the quasiparticles and gives rise to steps displaced in voltage by  relative to the gap voltage.

Device fabrication 
The device is typically fabricated by first depositing a thin film of a superconducting metal such as aluminum on an insulating substrate such as silicon. The deposition is performed inside a vacuum chamber. Oxygen gas is then introduced into the chamber, resulting in the formation of an insulating layer of aluminum oxide (AlO) with a typical thickness of several nanometers. After the vacuum is restored, an overlapping layer of superconducting metal is deposited, completing the STJ. To create a well-defined overlap region, a procedure known as the Niemeyer-Dolan technique is commonly used. This technique uses a suspended bridge of resist with a double-angle deposition to define the junction.

Aluminum is widely used for making superconducting tunnel junctions because of its unique ability to form a very thin (2-3 nm) insulating oxide layer with no defects that short-circuit the insulating layer. The superconducting critical temperature of aluminum is approximately 1.2 kelvin (K). For many applications, it is convenient to have a device that is superconducting at a higher temperature, in particular at a temperature above the boiling point of liquid helium, which is 4.2 K at atmospheric pressure. One approach to achieving this is to use niobium, which has a superconducting critical temperature in bulk form of 9.3 K. Niobium, however, does not form an oxide that is suitable for making tunnel junctions. To form an insulating oxide, the first layer of niobium can be coated with a very thin layer (approximately 5 nm) of aluminum, which is then oxidized to form a high quality aluminum oxide tunnel barrier before the final layer of niobium is deposited. The thin aluminum layer is proximitized by the thicker niobium, and the resulting device has a superconducting critical temperature above 4.2 K. Early work used lead-lead oxide-lead tunnel junctions. Lead has a superconducting critical temperature of 7.2 K in bulk form, but lead oxide tends to develop defects (sometimes called pinhole defects) that short-circuit the tunnel barrier when the device is thermally cycled between cryogenic temperatures and room temperature, so lead is no longer widely used to make STJs.

Applications

Radio astronomy
STJs are the most sensitive heterodyne receivers in the 100 GHz to 1000 GHz frequency range, and hence are used for radio astronomy at these frequencies. In this application, the STJ is dc biased at a voltage just below the gap voltage. A high frequency signal from an astronomical object of interest is focused onto the STJ, along with a local oscillator source. Photons absorbed by the STJ allow quasiparticles to tunnel via the process of photon-assisted tunneling. This photon-assisted tunneling changes the current-voltage curve, creating a nonlinearity that produces an output at the difference frequency of the astronomical signal and the local oscillator. This output is a frequency down-converted version of the astronomical signal. These receivers are so sensitive that an accurate description of the device performance must take into account the effects of quantum noise.

Single-photon detection
In addition to heterodyne detection, STJs can also be used as direct detectors. In this application, the STJ is biased with a dc voltage less than the gap voltage. A photon absorbed in the superconductor breaks Cooper pairs and creates quasiparticles. The quasiparticles tunnel across the junction in the direction of the applied voltage, and the resulting tunneling current is proportional to the photon energy. STJ devices have been employed as single-photon detectors for photon frequencies ranging from X-rays to the infrared.

SQUIDs
The superconducting quantum interference device or SQUID is based on a superconducting loop containing Josephson junctions. SQUIDs are the world's most sensitive magnetometers, capable of measuring a single magnetic flux quantum.

Quantum computing
Superconducting quantum computing utilizes STJ-based circuits, including charge qubits, flux qubits and phase qubits.

RSFQ
The STJ is the primary active element in rapid single flux quantum or RSFQ fast logic circuits.

Josephson voltage standard
When a high frequency current is applied to a Josephson junction, the ac Josephson current will synchronize with the applied frequency giving rise to regions of constant voltage in the I-V curve of the device (Shapiro steps).  For the purpose of voltage standards, these steps occur at the voltages  where  is an integer,  is the applied frequency and the Josephson constant 
These steps provide an exact conversion from frequency to voltage. Because frequency can be measured with very high precision, this effect is used as the basis of the Josephson voltage standard, which implements the international definition of the "conventional" volt.

Josephson diode 
In the case that the STJ shows asymmetric Josephson tunneling, the junction can become a Josephson diode.

See also
 Superconductivity
 Josephson effect
 Macroscopic quantum phenomena
 Quantum tunneling
 Superconducting quantum interference device (SQUID)
 Superconducting quantum computing
 Rapid single flux quantum (RSFQ)
 Cryogenic particle detectors

References

Superconductivity
Josephson effect
Quantum electronics
Superconducting detectors
Sensors
Radio astronomy
Mesoscopic physics